Milind Anna Kamble is an Indian politician and member of the Nationalist Congress Party.  Kamble won the Kurla (Vidhan Sabha constituency) in 2009 Maharashtra Legislative Assembly election.

References

Living people
Maharashtra MLAs 2009–2014
Marathi politicians
Nationalist Congress Party politicians from Maharashtra
Year of birth missing (living people)